AHL or Ahl may refer to:

Places 
 Ahl, East Azerbaijan, Iran
 Ahel, Iran
 Kudian, Lamerd, Iran
 Ahlu, village in Lahore, Pakistan, ancestral place of the Ahluwalia

Sports leagues 
 American Hockey League, professional ice hockey league in the US and Canada
 Alps Hockey League, professional ice hockey league in Austria, Italy, and Slovenia
 Australian Hockey League, Australian national field hockey league
 Allianz Hurling League, name of the National Hurling League whilst sponsored by Allianz.

Other uses
 Ahl (surname)
 Ahlon language
 Associated Humber Lines, an English shipping company
 N-Acyl homoserine lactone
 Achalaite, a mineral with the IMA symbol Ahl